Bucculatrix longula is a moth in the family Bucculatricidae. It was described by Annette Frances Braun in 1963. It is found in North America, where it has been recorded from California, Texas, Washington and Utah.

The larvae feed on Helianthus annuus. They create a stem gall.

References

Natural History Museum Lepidoptera generic names catalog

Bucculatricidae
Moths described in 1963
Moths of North America
Taxa named by Annette Frances Braun